William Hoster House is a historic home located at Fayette in Seneca County, New York.  It is a four bay wide, two story, brick dwelling built about 1830 in the Federal style and later modified in the 1850s-1860s in the Italianate style. The hipped roof on the main block is topped by a distinctive octagonal cupola. Also on the property is a small, gable roofed corn crib.

It was listed on the National Register of Historic Places in 2002.

In 2021, the house was completely hidden from the road by trees and vines.

MORE PHOTOS COMING.

DOES THE CORN CRIB still exist?

References

External links

Houses on the National Register of Historic Places in New York (state)
Federal architecture in New York (state)
Italianate architecture in New York (state)
Houses completed in 1830
Houses in Seneca County, New York
1830 establishments in New York (state)
National Register of Historic Places in Seneca County, New York
Fayette, New York